Mudalikulam Raman Anitha (born 31 May 1961) is the judge of Kerala High Court. The High Court of Kerala is the highest court in the Indian state of Kerala and in the Union Territory of Lakshadweep. The High Court of Kerala is headquartered at Ernakulam, Kochi.

Early life and education
Anitha was born at Kuzhikkattussery, Thrissur to M.K.Raman and P.R.Radha. Anitha graduated from St. Joseph's College, Irinjalakuda and obtained a law degree from Government Law College, Ernakulam.

Career
Anitha joined Kerala Judicial Service on 28 January, 1991. She was appointed as Additional District and Sessions Judge in 2005 at Thiruvananthapuram as Fast Track-III, served as Principal District and Sessions Judge of Wayanad and as Principal District and Sessions Judge of Kozhikode. 06 March 2020 she was appointed as additional judge of Kerala High Court.

References

External links
 High Court of Kerala

Living people
Judges of the Kerala High Court
21st-century Indian judges
1961 births
Indian judges